Research Evaluation is a quarterly peer-reviewed academic journal covering the "evaluation of activities concerned with scientific research, technological development and innovation". It was established in 1991 and is published by Oxford University Press. The editors-in-chief are Thed van Leeuwen (University of Leiden), Julia Melkers (Georgia Institute of Technology), Emanuela Reale (Consiglio Nazionale delle Ricerche).

Abstracting and indexing
The journal is abstracted and indexed in:
Current Contents/Social and Behavioral Sciences
EBSCO databases
Education Resources Information Center
International Bibliography of Periodical Literature
Scopus
Social Sciences Citation Index
According to the Journal Citation Reports, the journal has a 2020 impact factor of 2.706.

References

External links

Information science journals
Oxford University Press academic journals
Quarterly journals
English-language journals
Publications established in 1991